Events from the 1580s in England.

Incumbents
 Monarch – Elizabeth I
 Parliament – 4th of Queen Elizabeth I (until 19 April 1583), 5th of Queen Elizabeth I (starting 23 November 1584, until 14 September 1585), 6th  of Queen Elizabeth I (starting 15 October 1586, until 23 March 1587), 7th of Queen Elizabeth I (starting 4 February, until 29 March 1589)

Events
 1580
 March – Thomas Legge's Richardus Tertius, the first known history play performed in England, is acted at St John's College, Cambridge.
 6 April – Dover Straits earthquake.
 June – England signs a commercial treaty with the Ottoman Empire.
 6 July – new building banned within three miles of the City of London.
 7 July – Robert Parsons and Edmund Campion begin a Jesuit mission in an attempt to restore Roman Catholicism to England, having landed the previous month.
 26 September – Francis Drake returns to Plymouth from his voyage of circumnavigation (westabout) on the Golden Hind, the first made by an Englishman.
 First recorded appearance of the ballad Greensleeves.
 1581
 March – Act against Reconciliation to Rome establishes heavy fines for recusancy or attending Catholic Mass.
 4 April – Drake knighted by Queen Elizabeth I aboard the Golden Hind at Deptford.
 1 December – execution of the Jesuit priest Edmund Campion for treason.
 1582
 May–August – Robert Browne and his Brownist congregationalist companions are obliged to leave England and go to Middelburg in the Netherlands.
 26 July – Battle of Ponta Delgada (Anglo-Spanish War): English mercenary galleons are among the fleet decisively defeated by the Spanish in the Azores.
 29 November – marriage of William Shakespeare and Anne Hathaway at Temple Grafton.
 Publication of Richard Hakluyt's Divers Voyages Touching the Discoverie of America.
 Publication of the first part of Richard Mulcaster's textbook on the teaching of English, the Elementarie.
 1583
 10 March – Queen Elizabeth's Men acting company founded.
 11 June – Sir Humphrey Gilbert sails from Dartmouth, Devon, to establish a colony in North America.
 5 August – Humphrey Gilbert, in what is to become the city of St John's, Newfoundland, claims the island of Newfoundland on behalf of England.
 14 August – John Whitgift nominated as Archbishop of Canterbury (enthroned 23 October).
 December – Francis Throckmorton's plot to invade England with the assistance of Henry I, Duke of Guise, and replace Elizabeth with Mary, Queen of Scots, is discovered by Francis Walsingham.
 10 December – great fire of Nantwich in Cheshire breaks out.
 Posthumous publication of Thomas Smith's treatise De Republica Anglorum: the Maner of Gouernement or Policie of the Realme of England (written 1562–65).
 Publication of Philip Stubbs' tract The Anatomie of Abuses.
 1584
 11 January – Sir Walter Mildmay is granted a royal licence to found Emmanuel College, Cambridge.
 10 July – execution of Francis Throckmorton.
 19 October – Bond of Association: thousands pledge to defend Queen Elizabeth, and avenge any successful assassination attempt.
 December – Jesuits and seminary priests banned from the country.
 The landmark decision in Heydon's Case introduces the mischief rule into the interpretation of statutes by the courts. 
 Publication of the cookbook A Booke of Cookry.
 1585
 6 January – Walter Ralegh knighted.
 2 March – William Parry executed for plotting Queen Elizabeth's murder.
 19 May – Spain seizes English ships in Spanish ports.
 7 July – England establishes the Roanoke Colony in North America.
 8 August – explorer John Davis (having set out on 7 June from Dartmouth) enters Cumberland Sound in Baffin Island in his quest for the Northwest Passage.
 14 August – Queen Elizabeth establishes a protectorate over the Netherlands.
 20 August – the Treaty of Nonsuch is signed, committing England to support for the Dutch Revolt against Habsburg rule.
 1586
 4 February – Robert Dudley, 1st Earl of Leicester accepts the title governor of the Netherlands.
 14 March – Black Assize of Exeter opens: "gaol fever" (probably epidemic typhus), spreading from Rougemont Castle in Exeter, kills 8 judges, 11 of 12 jurors, and ravages the surrounding population for several months; many prominent members of the Devonshire gentry are among the dead.
 7 May – John Davis sets out from Dartmouth, Devon, for a second attempt to find the Northwest Passage.
 1 July – Treaty of Berwick agreed between Queen Elizabeth I of England and King James VI of Scotland.
 17 July – Walsingham uncovers the Babington Plot to murder Elizabeth.
 21 July – Thomas Cavendish sets out from Plymouth in the Desire on the first deliberately planned circumnavigation of the globe.
 28 July – Thomas Harriot returns from a voyage to Colombia with the first potatoes seen in England.
 20–21 September – execution of Anthony Babington, John Ballard, Chidiock Tichborne, Thomas Salisbury and the other 10 conspirators in the Babington Plot, who are hanged, drawn and quartered (the first seven being disembowelled before death) in St Giles Field, London.
 22 September – Battle of Zutphen: Spanish troops defeat Dutch rebels and their English allies. Poet and courtier Sir Philip Sidney is mortally wounded and dies on 17 October.
 15–25 October – Mary, Queen of Scots, placed on treason trial at Fotheringhay Castle for complicity in the Babington Plot and sentenced to death.
 19 November – Separatist Puritan Henry Barrowe is imprisoned.
 Great fire of Beccles.
 Vanguard, the first Royal Navy ship to bear this name, is launched at Woolwich Dockyard.
 Topographer William Harrison becomes canon of Windsor.
 William Camden publishes his pioneering antiquarian study Britannia.
 William Warner first publishes his long historical poem Albion's England.
 Oxford University Press is recognised by decree of the Star Chamber.
 From about this date an informal College or Society of Antiquaries begins to meet.
 1587
 8 February – Mary, Queen of Scots, is beheaded at Fotheringay Castle.
 1 March – Sir Anthony Cope and Sir Peter Wentworth are imprisoned for attempting to bring forward Parliamentary legislation interfering with the Queen's ecclesiastical prerogative.
 19 April (29 April New Style) – "Singeing the King of Spain's Beard": On an expedition against Spain, privateer Sir Francis Drake leads a raid in the Bay of Cádiz, sinking at least 23 ships of the Spanish fleet and delaying the sending of the Spanish Armada.
 19 May – John Davis sets out from Dartmouth, Devon, for a third attempt to find the Northwest Passage.
 22 July – Roanoke Colony: A group of English settlers arrive on Roanoke Island off North Carolina to re-establish the deserted colony.
 21 December – Lord Howard of Effingham given command of both army and navy in the war against Spain.
 Late (probable date) – the first part of Christopher Marlowe's drama Tamburlaine the Great is performed in London by the Admiral's Men with Edward Alleyn playing the lead.
 The Rose theatre is founded in London by Philip Henslowe.
 Everard Digby's De Arte Natandi, the first treatise on swimming in England, is published.
 The doctrine Cuius est solum, eius est usque ad coelum et ad inferos is established in common law by Edward Coke.
 1588
 1 January – the Children of Paul's act at the court of Queen Elizabeth, probably performing John Lyly's Gallathea.
 28–30 May – the Spanish Armada sets sail from the Tagus estuary for an attempted invasion of England.
 19 July – the Armada is sighted off The Lizard in Cornwall; the news is relayed to London via a series of beacons built along the south coast.
 21 July – the first engagement between the English and Spanish fleets, off Plymouth, results in an English victory. The English fleet is under the command of Lord Howard of Effingham with Sir Francis Drake as Vice Admiral.
 23 July – the English and Spanish fleets meet again, off Portland; the English again have the better of it.
 28 July – the English send fire ships into the French fleet, now anchored off Calais, breaking their formation.
 29 July –  the English fleet defeats the Armada at the Battle of Gravelines.
 2 August – the fleeing Spanish fleet sails past the Firth of Forth and the English call off their pursuit. Much of the Spanish fleet will be destroyed by storms as it sails for home around Scotland and Ireland.
 9 August –  Queen Elizabeth makes her speech to the Troops at Tilbury.
 1 October – Oaten Hill Martyrs: four Catholics are hanged, drawn and quartered at Canterbury.
 October–November – the Marprelate Controversy, a war of pamphlets between Presbyterians and supporters of the established church, breaks out with publication of the Epistle by "Martin Marprelate" on Robert Waldegrave's secret press at Molesey and Fawsley.
George Gower paints the Armada Portrait of Queen Elizabeth.
 Nicholas Hilliard paints the portrait miniature Young Man Among Roses.
 First record of marbles being played at Tinsley Green, West Sussex. 
1588–1589 – earliest probable date for the composition and first performance of Christopher Marlowe's The Tragicall History of the Life and Death of Doctor Faustus in London.
 1589
 13 April – an English Armada led by Sir Francis Drake and Sir John Norreys and largely financed by private investors sets sail to attack the Iberian Peninsula's Atlantic coast but fails to achieve any naval advantage.
 Publication of Richard Hakluyt's The Principal Navigations, Voiages, Traffiques and Discoueries of the English Nation begins.

Births
 1580
 February – John Digby, 1st Earl of Bristol, diplomat (died 1653)
 8 April – William Herbert, 3rd Earl of Pembroke, courtier (died 1630)
 15 April – George Calvert, 1st Baron Baltimore, politician and colonizer (died 1623)
 18 April (baptism) – Thomas Middleton, playwright (died 1627)
 24 August – John Taylor, poet (died 1654)
 4 December – Samuel Argall, adventurer and naval officer (died 1626)
 Edward Fairfax, translator (died 1635)
 1581
 Edmund Gunter, mathematician (died 1621)
 Thomas Overbury, poet and essayist (murdered 1613)
 1582
 8 April (baptism) – Phineas Fletcher, poet (died 1650)
 28 May – William Fiennes, 1st Viscount Saye and Sele, statesman (died 1662)
 John Bainbridge, astronomer (died 1648)
 Richard Corbet, poet (died 1635)
 William Juxon, Archbishop of Canterbury (died 1663)
 Thomas Moulson, Lord Mayor of London (died 1638)
 Francis Windebank, politician (died 1646)
 1583
 3 March – Edward Herbert, 1st Baron Herbert of Cherbury, diplomat, poet and philosopher (died 1648)
 November – Philip Massinger, dramatist (died 1640)
 17 December – Robert Bertie, 1st Earl of Lindsey, adventurer and soldier (killed in battle) (died 1642)
 25 December – Orlando Gibbons, composer (died 1625)
 Approximate date
John Beaumont, poet (died 1627)
 Aurelian Townshend, poet (died 1643)
 1584
 29 March – Ferdinando Fairfax, 2nd Lord Fairfax of Cameron, parliamentary general (died 1648)
 19 April – John Hales, theologian (died 1656)
 20 May – John Pym, parliamentarian (died 1643)
 6 August – Robert Pierrepont, 1st Earl of Kingston-upon-Hull (died 1643)
 13 August – Theophilus Howard, 2nd Earl of Suffolk, politician (died 1640)
 16 December – John Selden, jurist (died 1654)
 21 December (baptism) – Thomas Weston, merchant adventurer (died c. 1647))
 Francis Beaumont, dramatist (died 1616)
 Approximate date
 William Baffin, explorer (died 1622)
 Mary Frith, cutpurse (died 1659)
 1585
 Early October – John Ball, puritan divine (died 1640)
 4 December – John Cotton, theologian and minister in the Massachusetts Bay colony (died 1652)
Elizabeth Cary, Lady Falkland, née Elizabeth Tanfield, poet, translator and dramatist (died 1639)
 John Danvers, politician (died 1655)
 1586
 12 April (baptism) – John Ford, dramatist and poet (died c. 1639)
 7 July – Thomas Howard, 21st Earl of Arundel, courtier (died 1646)
 14 August – William Hutchinson, founder of Rhode Island (died 1642)
 11 December (baptism) – John Mason, explorer (died 1635)
 Approximate date – Giles Fletcher, poet (died 1623)
 1587
 5 June – Robert Rich, 2nd Earl of Warwick, colonial administrator and admiral (died 1658)
 July – George Yeardley, colonial administrator in America (died 1627)
 18 August – Virginia Dare, first child born in the New World (Roanoke Colony) to English parents
 19 September – Robert Sanderson, Bishop of Lincoln, theologian (died 1663)
 17 October – Nathan Field, dramatist and actor (died 1620)
 18 October – Lady Mary Wroth, poet (died 1651/3)
 William Feilding, 1st Earl of Denbigh (died 1643)
 Francis Kynaston, courtier and poet (died 1642)
 1588
 5 April – Thomas Hobbes, philosopher (died 1679)
 26 May (baptism) – Accepted Frewen, Archbishop of York (died 1664)
 11 June – George Wither, poet and satirist (died 1667)
 10 September (baptism) – Nicholas Lanier, composer and musician (died 1666)
 Robert Filmer, political writer (died 1653)

Deaths
 1580
 24 February – Henry FitzAlan, 19th Earl of Arundel, nobleman (born 1511)
 3 May – Thomas Tusser, poet and farmer (born 1524)
 30 November – Richard Farrant, composer (born 1530)
 John Heywood, dramatist (born 1497)
 1581
 22 July – Richard Cox, bishop (born 1500)
 1 December
Edmund Campion, Jesuit (executed) (born 1540)
 Alexander Briant, Jesuit priest (executed) (born 1556)
 Ralph Sherwin, Catholic priest (executed) (born 1550)
 Nicholas Sanders, Catholic priest and historian (born 1530)
 1583
 9 June – Thomas Radclyffe, 3rd Earl of Sussex, Lord-Lieutenant of Ireland (born 1525)
 6 July – Edmund Grindal, Archbishop of Canterbury (born 1519)
 9 September – Humphrey Gilbert, English explorer (born c. 1537)
 1584
 10 March – Thomas Norton, politician and writer (born 1532)
 10 July – Francis Throckmorton, conspirator against Queen Elizabeth I (born 1554)
 12 July – Steven Borough, explorer (born 1525)
 23 July – John Day, Protestant printer (born 1522)
 1585
 January – Anthony Gilby, Puritan and Bible translator (born c. 1510)
 16 January – Edward Fiennes Clinton, admiral (born 1512)
 6 February – Edmund Plowden, legal scholar (born 1518)
 3 April – Thomas Goldwell, ecclesiastic
 21 June – Henry Percy, 8th Earl of Northumberland, nobleman and conspirator, suicide (born 1532)
 6 July – Thomas Aufield, Catholic martyr (born 1552)
 28 July – Francis Russell, 2nd Earl of Bedford, nobleman, soldier and politician (born 1527)
 23 November – Thomas Tallis, English composer (born c. 1510)
 1586
 24 March – Margaret Clitherow, Catholic saint and martyr (born 1556)
 5 May – Henry Sidney, Lord Deputy of Ireland (born 1529)
 12 July – Edward Sutton, 4th Baron Dudley (born 1525)
 20 September
 Sir Anthony Babington, Catholic conspirator (executed) (born 1561)
 Chidiock Tichborne, conspirator and poet (executed) (born 1558)
 17 October – Sir Philip Sidney, poet, courtier and soldier (died of wounds) (born 1554)
 1587
 January – Thomas Seckford, official (born 1515)
 30 March – Ralph Sadler, statesman (born 1507)
 8 April – John Foxe, author (born 1516)
 14 April – Edward Manners, 3rd Earl of Rutland (born 1549)
 16 April – Anne Stanhope, Duchess of Somerset (born 1497)
 September – George Whetstone, writer (duel) (born 1544)
 Dudley Fenner, puritan divine (born c. 1558)
 1588
 18 June – Robert Crowley, London stationer (born 1517)
 10 July – Edwin Sandys, Archbishop of York (born 1519)
 30 August – Margaret Ward, Catholic martyr and saint (year of birth unknown)
 3 September – Richard Tarlton, actor (born 1530)
 4 September – Robert Dudley, 1st Earl of Leicester, politician (born 1532)
 1 October – Edward James, Catholic martyr, executed at Chichester (born c. 1557)
 Approximate date – Roger Dudley, soldier (born between 1535 and 1545)
 1589
 21 February – Ambrose Dudley, 3rd Earl of Warwick (born c. 1528)
 2 April – Raleigh, Native American captive in the household of Richard Grenville

References